Allan Stewart may refer to:

Allan Stewart (artist) (1865–1951), painter of military scenes and battles
Allan Stewart (comedian) (born 1950), British comic and impressionist
Allan Stewart (footballer), Scottish international footballer, 1888–1889
Allan Stewart (ice hockey) (born 1964), retired National Hockey League left winger
Allan Stewart (Jacobite), legendary Jacobite in "the Appin murder" who inspired both Walter Scott and Robert Louis Stevenson
Allan Stewart (musician) (born 1977), guitarist in the bands Idlewild and DeSalvo
Allan Stewart (politician) (1942−2016), Conservative Party Scottish politician
Allan Stewart (rugby union) (born 1940), New Zealand rugby union player
Allan Stewart, Commendator of Crossraguel Abbey, tortured by Gilbert Kennedy, 4th Earl of Cassilis

See also
Alan Stewart (disambiguation)